Medayakkottai is a village in the Orathanadu taluk of Thanjavur district, Tamil Nadu, India.

Demographics 

As per the 2001 census, Medayakkottai had a total population of 713 with 344 males and 369 females. The sex ratio was 1073. The literacy rate was 61.34.

References 

 

Villages in Thanjavur district